Mick Miller may refer to:

Mick Miller (Aboriginal statesman) (1937–1998), Australian political activist
Mick Miller (comedian) (born 1950), British comedian
Mick Miller (cricketer) (born 1979), Australian cricketer
Mick Miller (police officer) (born 1926), Australian police officer

See also
Mick the Miller (1926–1939), greyhound
Miller (name)
Michael Miller (disambiguation)
Mac Miller (1992–2018), American rapper, singer, and record producer
Mack Miller (disambiguation)
Miller (disambiguation)
Mick (disambiguation)